In enzymology, a guanosine-5'-triphosphate,3'-diphosphate diphosphatase is an enzyme that catalyzes the chemical reaction

guanosine 5'-triphosphate,3'-diphosphate + H2O  guanosine 5'-diphosphate,3'-diphosphate + phosphate

Thus, the two substrates of this enzyme are guanosine 5'-triphosphate,3'-diphosphate and H2O, whereas its two products are guanosine 5'-diphosphate,3'-diphosphate and phosphate.

This enzyme belongs to the family of hydrolases, specifically those acting on acid anhydrides in phosphorus-containing anhydrides.  The systematic name of this enzyme class is guanosine-5'-triphosphate,3'-diphosphate 5'-phosphohydrolase. Other names in common use include pppGpp 5'-phosphohydrolase, guanosine-5'-triphosphate,3'-diphosphate pyrophosphatase, guanosine 5'-triphosphate-3'-diphosphate 5'-phosphohydrolase, guanosine pentaphosphatase, guanosine pentaphosphate phosphatase, guanosine 5'-triphosphate 3'-diphosphate 5'-phosphatase, and guanosine pentaphosphate phosphohydrolase.  This enzyme participates in purine metabolism.

Structural studies

References

 

EC 3.6.1
Enzymes of known structure